Macaduma montana is a moth of the subfamily Arctiinae. It was described by Robinson in 1975. It is found on Fiji.

References

Macaduma
Moths described in 1975